Labyrinth Mountain is a prominent  mountain summit located  north-northeast of Stevens Pass in Chelan County of Washington state. Its nearest higher neighbor is Rock Mountain,  to the southeast. Labyrinth Mountain was named by Albert Hale Sylvester for the appearance of its complex topographic map contour lines, similar to a Labyrinth. In association with Greek mythology, he also named Minotaur and Theseus Lakes on this mountain's southeast aspect. Precipitation runoff from the peak drains into tributaries of the Little Wenatchee River.

Climate

Lying east of the Cascade crest, the area around Labyrinth Mountain is a bit drier than areas to the west. Summers can bring warm temperatures and occasional thunderstorms. Most weather fronts originate in the Pacific Ocean, and travel east toward the Cascade Mountains. As fronts approach, they are forced upward by the peaks of the Cascade Range, causing them to drop their moisture in the form of rain or snowfall onto the Cascades (Orographic lift). As a result, the western slopes of the Cascades experience high precipitation, especially during the winter months in the form of snowfall. During winter months, weather is usually cloudy, but, due to high pressure systems over the Pacific Ocean that intensify during summer months, there is often little or no cloud cover during the summer. The months July through September offer the most favorable weather for viewing or climbing this peak.

Geology

The North Cascades features some of the most rugged topography in the Cascade Range with craggy peaks, ridges, and deep glacial valleys. Geological events occurring many years ago created the diverse topography and drastic elevation changes over the Cascade Range leading to various climate differences. 

The history of the formation of the Cascade Mountains dates back millions of years ago to the late Eocene Epoch. With the North American Plate overriding the Pacific Plate, episodes of volcanic igneous activity persisted. In addition, small fragments of the oceanic and continental lithosphere called terranes created the North Cascades about 50 million years ago.

During the Pleistocene period dating back over two million years ago, glaciation advancing and retreating repeatedly scoured and shaped the landscape. Uplift and faulting in combination with glaciation have been the dominant processes which have created the tall peaks and deep valleys of the North Cascades area.

See also

 Geology of the Pacific Northwest
 Geography of the North Cascades

References

External links
 Weather forecast: Labyrinth Mountain
 Climbing Labyrinth Mountain: Mountaineers.org

Mountains of Chelan County, Washington
Mountains of Washington (state)
Cascade Range
North Cascades
North American 1000 m summits